Guy James Robin (born 2 August 1989), known professionally as Jonas Blue, is an English DJ, songwriter, record producer, and remixer based in London. He is widely known for recruiting young artistes for his dance productions, which blends pop.

Career

2015–2017: Breakthrough and Jonas Blue: Electronic Nature – The Mix 2017 
In 2015, Blue released a tropical house cover of Tracy Chapman's 1988 single "Fast Car". It was his debut single and features vocals from Dakota. The Jonas Blue version peaked at number two on the UK Singles Chart, behind Zayn Malik's "Pillowtalk". Its UK peak meant it charted higher than Chapman's original, which peaked at number five on the chart in May 1988 and a position higher upon a re-release in April 2011. It also remained in the top 10 for 11 weeks. The Jonas Blue version also reached number one in Germany, Sweden, Australia and New Zealand, as well as reaching the number one spot on the US viral chart on Spotify. The single has been certified platinum in Italy and the UK, 2× platinum in New Zealand and 3× platinum in Australia. To date, the track has been streamed over 1 billion times on Spotify, and has achieved over 310 million views on Vevo.

On 3 June 2016, he released a new single titled "Perfect Strangers", featuring JP Cooper on Virgin EMI Records. It peaked at No. 2 on the UK Singles Chart. To date, the song has been certified platinum in the UK, double platinum in Australia and gold in New Zealand. The track also led to Blue reaching one billion streams across his tracks and videos. October 2016 saw the release of his third single titled "By Your Side", featuring British singer Raye, again on Virgin EMI Records. It peaked at No. 15 on the UK Singles Chart.

On 5 May 2017, he released the song "Mama", featuring Australian singer William Singe which charted at No. 4 on the UK Singles Chart. On 14 July 2017, Jonas Blue released the compilation album called "Jonas Blue: Electronic Nature - The Mix 2017".

2017–2019: Blue 
On 14 September 2017, Jonas Blue produced the song "Heartline" sung by Craig David for his album The Time is Now. It managed to chart at No. 24 on the UK Singles Chart. On 13 October 2017, the single "We Could Go Back" was released, featuring Moelogo. It charted at No. 74 on the UK Singles Chart.

On 5 January 2018, Blue released "Hearts Ain't Gonna Lie", with Arlissa. On 16 March 2018, he released the single "Alien" with Sabrina Carpenter. On 25 May 2018, he released "Rise" featuring Jack & Jack. It charted at No. 3 on the UK Singles Chart. He released "I See Love" featuring Joe Jonas on 29 June 2018, which appears on the Hotel Transylvania 3 soundtrack as well as Blue's debut album. American DJ MK released a song titled "Back & Forth" with Blue and English singer-songwriter Becky Hill. It charted at No. 12 in the UK. Bantu released "Roll with Me" with Blue featuring Shungudzo and ZieZie on 21 September 2018. On 5 October 2018, Blue released "Polaroid" with English singer Liam Payne and Canadian singer Lennon Stella as the eighth single from the debut studio album Blue. The song charted at No. 12 on the UK Singles Chart. His debut album, Blue, was released on 9 November 2018. It was also confirmed that Blue was to be the executive producer of British girl group Four of Diamonds' debut album. On 30 November 2018, Jonas Blue produced the song 'Blind' sung by Four of Diamonds for their upcoming album.

"Desperate" featuring Nina Nesbitt was released as the ninth single from Blue's debut album on 23 January 2019. "Wild" featuring Chelcee Grimes, TINI and Jhay Cortez was released as the tenth and final single from the album on 27 February 2019.

2019–2020: Est. 1989 
On 22 March 2019, Blue released "What I Like About You" featuring Theresa Rex. It peaked at No. 16 on the UK Singles Chart. On 31 May 2019, Dutch DJ Tiësto released the song "Ritual" with Blue and British singer Rita Ora, which peaked at No. 24 on the UK Singles Chart. On 19 July 2019, Blue released the song "I Wanna Dance", followed by the song "Younger" with English singer Hrvy on 6 September 2019.

On 19 November 2020, Jonas Blue co-produced the song "My Head & My Heart" for Ava Max from her album Heaven & Hell, which reached the top 20 of the UK Singles Chart.

2021–present: New music and Endless Summer 
On 5 February 2021, Jonas Blue released the song "Something Stupid" with Awa. On 28 May 2021, Jonas Blue released the song "Hear Me Say" with LÉON. The song debuted on the UK Singles Chart at No.65. He shared that the music video was meant to "capture escapism and wanderlust" while sharing positivity in a time when the COVID-19 pandemic limited travel. He also admitted the song "hits emotionally" and expressed pride at fans' reception of the track.

On 10 September 2021, Blue collaborated with R3hab featuring Ava Max and Kylie Cantrall on the song "Sad Boy". On 7 January 2022, Blue released the song "Don't Wake Me Up" with Why Don't We. On 25 March 2022, Blue released the song "Angles" with Sevenn. On 8 April 2022, Blue released the song "Siento". On 6 May 2022, Blue and Sam Feldt released the song "Til The End" under the project Endless Summer with Sam Derosa. On 27 May 2022, Blue collaborated with Julian Perretta on the song "Perfect Melody". On 2 September 2022, Blue and Louisa Johnson released the song "Always Be There".

Discography 

 Blue (2018)

Awards and nominations

See also 
 List of Australian chart achievements and milestones
 2016 in British music charts

References

External links 
 

Living people
Musicians from London
1989 births
Tropical house musicians
British electronic dance music musicians
DJs from London
English record producers
English songwriters
Electronic dance music DJs
Remixers
Capitol Records artists
Positiva Records artists
Virgin EMI Records artists